40 Aurigae is a binary star in the constellation Auriga.  Its apparent magnitude is 5.345, meaning it can just barely be seen with the naked eye. Based on parallax estimates made by the Hipparcos spacecraft, the system is located some 340 light-years (104 parsecs) away.

40 Aurigae is a spectroscopic binary, meaning the two stars are too close to be individually resolved, but periodic Doppler shifts in their spectra indicate there must be orbital motion. In this case, light from both stars can be detected and it is a double-lined spectroscopic binary. The two have an orbital period of 28.28 days and a fairly high eccentricity of 0.56. The primary star is an A-type main-sequence star and shows unusual absorption lines in its spectrum, so it is an Am star with an effective temperature of 7,838 K.

References

External links
 40 Aurigae data
 HR 2143
 Image 40 Aurigae

Auriga (constellation)
Spectroscopic binaries
041357
028946
Aurigae, 40
Am stars
2143
Durchmusterung objects